Space: Above and Beyond is an American science fiction television series that originally aired on Fox, created and written by Glen Morgan and James Wong. Originally planned for five seasons, it only ran for one season from 1995–1996 before being canceled, mainly due to low ratings. It was nominated for two Emmy Awards and one Saturn Award. Ranked last in IGN's top 50 Sci-Fi TV Shows, it was described as "yet another sci-fi show that went before its time".

Set in the years 2063–2064, the show focuses on the "Wildcards", members of the United States Marine Corps 58th Squadron of the Space Aviator Cavalry. They are stationed on the space carrier USS Saratoga, acting as both infantry and pilots of SA-43 Endo/Exo-Atmospheric Attack Jet ("Hammerhead") fighters, battling an invading force of extraterrestrials.

Plot
Lacking technology that would enable faster-than-light, or FTL, travel, colonization is accomplished by taking advantage of transient but predictable, naturally occurring wormholes in space which allow travelers to traverse vast distances. Without warning, a previously unknown alien species, the "Chigs", attack and destroy Earth's first extra-solar colony and then destroy a second colony ship. The bulk of the Earth military forces sent to confront the Chigs are destroyed or outflanked, in part because the Chigs have some form of FTL, affording them greater freedom of movement (although this technology appears limited, the Chigs also often use natural wormholes).

At the opening of the series, the Chigs have defeated all counter-attacks, and have entered the Solar System. In desperation, unproven and under-trained outfits like the 58th "Wildcards" are thrown against the Chigs. The Wildcards are the focus of the series, which follows them as they grow from untried cadets into veterans. Although the unified Earth forces come under the control of a reformed United Nations, the UN has no formal armed forces, so navies such as the U.S. Navy and the Royal Navy operate interstellar starships.

Prior to the events of the show, there was a war between humans and androids known as Silicates. These human-looking androids, referred to as "walking personal computers", have rebelled, formed their own societies and wage a guerrilla war against the humans from remote bases. The Silicates are also suspected of conniving with the Chigs. To defeat the Silicates, a new underclass of genetically engineered and artificially gestated humans were bred to quickly swell the ranks of the military. These troops, collectively known as In Vitroes or sometimes, pejoratively, "tanks" or "nipple-necks", are born at the physical age of 18 and trained solely for combat. In the post-war period the tanks have attempted (with mixed success) to re-enter human society.

Story arcs 
Space: Above and Beyond connects episodes through prominent story arcs beside that of the main arc, the Chig War. In an approximated descending order of significance, these are:

Chig War (2063–) 

Chigs (sometimes referred to as Glyphs) are a fictional alien species in the science fiction television series Space: Above and Beyond. Chig is not the species' name for itself but a human-coined nickname (referencing the chigoe flea).

Background

Chigs are humanoid, bipedal aliens that serve as the primary antagonists in the series. They appear to be unable to survive in atmospheres that support human life; they are often seen wearing armored life-support systems that provide them with the methane they need to breathe. Chig armor suits also have a suicide mechanism that is triggered when the helmet is forcibly removed, quickly dissolving the Chig inside. In the episode "Choice or Chance", a Chig is apparently able to take human form and interact with other humans in an ordinary atmosphere until killed, when it turns to slime in the manner of earlier Chig deaths. How this is achieved is not explained. Distinguishing characteristics of the un-armored Chig are small black eyes set deeply in the head, pink skin, a lack of a prominent nose, a protruding upper jaw, and structures resembling gills to either side of the mandible.

The series provides little evidence about the Chigs until the last two episodes, choosing to initially present the Chigs as a traditional science-fiction alien enemy out to destroy humanity. Throughout the series, the writers provide several small clues regarding the nature of the Chigs, their motives and their biology before devoting the last two episodes of the series to revealing the possibility that Chigs and humans are related species.

History

As the series presents it, human contact with the Chigs begins when an unmanned probe, launched by the military-industrial corporation Aero-Tech, lands on "celestial body 2064K" (later given military designation 'Anvil'), the moon orbiting the Chig homeworld. This moon is sacred to the Chigs because it is where life originated via panspermia and where Chigs still go to be born. The Chigs evolved from bacteria that originated on Earth billions of years ago: an asteroid collision threw these bacteria into space, carried by meteorites, where they eventually landed on the Chig sacred moon. Life on Earth had already advanced to the eukaryote stage of development and the rate of evolution proceeded slightly faster for the bacteria on their new world, allowing life there to evolve to the point that it could produce the sentient Chigs at roughly the same time that modern humans evolved.

The Aero-Tech probe manages to obtain a limited amount of data before the Chigs send a warning signal through it before destroying the probe. Aero-Tech, for unknown reasons, apparently chooses to keep this "first contact" a secret from the governments of Earth. In early 2063, Chigs declare war on humanity, launching what appears to be an unprovoked first-strike against humanity's budding interstellar colonies. The colonists, sponsored by Aero-Tech and called the Vesta and Tellus colonies, are attacked, destroyed and the few survivors taken prisoner. The Chig space forces begin a push towards Earth, devastating the unprepared Earth forces. Only the actions of the US Marines Aviator 58th Squadron at the Battle of the Belt prevent Earth itself from falling (the battle was fought in the Trojan asteroid field at Jupiter's Lagrangian point, not the main asteroid belt).

Through surprise, superior numbers and advanced technology, the Chigs gained the advantage in early battles. Humanity's adaptability and ferocity catches them off guard. The Chigs, who favor large, direct military strategies, are unprepared for the guerrilla tactics used by the human forces. Special operations missions, infiltrations, assassinations, sabotage and small unit engagements all prove effective against the Chig attackers. The Chigs ally with the remnants of the Silicates, a human-built race of androids, that fled to space after losing the AI Wars on Earth. The nature of the alliance is vague and not expanded upon in the series. Just as humans are ready to conquer the Chig homeworld, an emissary comes to negotiate for peaceful relations. The emissary reveals that humans and Chigs seem to have a common origin, based on their chemical makeup.

Technology

Chig technology is slightly more advanced than Human technology at the beginning of the series, though only loosely, on the scale of a few decades of advancement. Chigs have faster than light spacefaring technology and advanced weapon systems. They use a combination of plasma-based energy weapons and ballistic missiles for their aerospace fighters and capital ships. Chig ground forces use anti-gravity hover tanks, T-77s for heavy armor and anti-personnel plasma weapons and flamethrowers. Study of downed Chig fightercraft in early episodes revealed that they are faster and have a better rate of climb than their human counterparts.  Human Hammerhead fighters have a heavier weapons load and are more maneuverable. The Chigs have large battleships and a destroyer class vessel capable of causing energy spikes within human starships reactors using a special microwave energy weapon generator. They also developed a stealth fighter with a hull impervious to standard aerial cannon fire. They also have a red colored fighter that can travel across the gravity field of a black hole.

Culture

Much about Chig society remains unknown throughout the series, presenting them as mysterious and terrifying aliens trying to destroy humanity. Their hierarchy and general social structures remain unexplained. From the Chig ambassador's claims in the final two episodes, it seems that they consider the moon they evolved on (codenamed "Anvil" by humans) to be "sacred". One curious practice observed since early in the war with humanity was that whenever Chig infantry encountered the grave of a dead human soldier, they would dig up the body and mutilate the corpse, typically by dismembering it. At first, the human military thought this was a terror-tactic, meant to frighten human soldiers. It was eventually discovered that while the Chigs may possess some form of "religion" (given that they consider their breeding grounds to be sacred), they never developed a concept of an afterlife.

Humans are, it turns out, just as much mysterious, terrifying aliens to the Chigs as they are to humans. As the Chigs encountered snippets of human culture, through intercepted radio transmissions or recovered personal effects, they drastically misinterpreted this alien concept of an "afterlife".  This led the Chigs to believe that dead human soldiers will literally spring back to life sometime after their death and that burying a corpse aids this process.  Genuinely terrified of this human "army of zombies", Chig infantry then began to dig up the graves of human soldiers they came across and dismember their corpses, to make sure they stay dead.

Just as humans have applied the derogatory "Chigs" to the aliens, they have a slang term for humans.  According to their Silicate allies, the term loosely translates as "Red Stink Creature".  Chigs have green instead of red blood, and smell like sulfur.  As it turns out, humans' red blood and non-sulfur smell strikes the Chigs as just as disturbingly "unnatural" as their alien biology seems to us.

Chigs of note

 "Chiggy von Richthofen" – named after Manfred von Richthofen – flew an advanced Chig stealth fighter, with the words "Abandon All Hope" written in English on its hull. Its armor was impervious to standard cannon fire, it was a superior vessel to Earth fighters and destroyed dozens of them. "Chiggy von Richthofen" was killed in a dogfight against Lt. Col. T.C. McQueen. McQueen used missiles to breach the armor of the fighter.
 Chig Ambassador: A Chig envoy sent alone and unarmed to the USS Saratoga to negotiate an end to hostilities between humans and Chigs. It was equipped with a translation device capable of producing English. The Chig attempted to explain the circumstances of the Vesta and Tellus colony massacres, blaming Aero-Tech CEO E. Allen Wayne for desecrating the sacred moon of their homeworld with an unmanned probe. When Wayne refused to admit to the act, the Chig attacked him. As Lt. Col. McQueen fired a weapon to kill the Chig ambassador, the mixture of methane and oxygen ignited resulting in an explosion that killed the Ambassador, Wayne and several top Earth military officers.

Silicates
Silicates are a fictional race of androids created by humanity to be servants.

History

The Silicates were created to be servants and soldiers, but they developed intelligence and sentience after they were infected by the Take a Chance computer virus created by Dr. Ken Stranahan (name from the show's visual effects supervisor). This sparked an AI rebellion by the Silicates, who attempted to free themselves from human rule. The war continued for many years, until the Silicates captured military space craft and escaped into space. As they went into space, the Silicates suffered from a lack of maintenance which caused problems for them. The remnants of the Silicates that fled into deep space serve as mercenaries and actually aid the alien Chigs in their war against humanity.

Capabilities

The AIs (Artificial Intelligence) were manufactured by humanity to serve them and appear as humans but with enough differences to appear as machine creations, namely the rifle sight-like crosshairs in place of pupils. They were made to be beautiful and physically appealing. The surviving Silicates that fled into deep space have been suffering from a lack of adequate maintenance for many years and frequently possess minor damage to their outer covering which reveals their machine parts underneath.

Silicates were designed to be domestic servants or pleasure models and not particularly for hard labor (which would be done by heavy machinery). As a result, standard Silicates are actually not that much stronger than a human and because they were not originally designed to fight it is not particularly difficult for a trained human soldier to defeat them in hand-to-hand combat. This is partially offset by the fact that Silicates are not hindered by physical pain and cannot experience fear.

Silicates communicate with one another through modulation schemes made by wireless telephone which comes across to humans as a series of electronic beeps and chirps. This wireless network allows each AI to know the position and operating status of the other units. Their mechanical nature allows them to store information and retrieve it making them excellent in information gathering which can be shared with their colleagues when demanded.

Behavior

As the AI Silicates were created as a "servitor" species, they were programmed to understand abstraction but with programmes that restricted original thought and creativity, which leaves them to simply imitate rather than create. Had the "Take a Chance" computer virus not been created, it is likely the Silicates would have remained servile. Risk-taking has become the prime ideology of the AI Silicates which results in them seeing activities as a risk or gamble. The first "risk" was the indiscriminate killing of their human creators in the AI War, which lasted for ten years. The Silicate robots refer to humans as "carbonites", because they are carbon-based life forms.

Because the Silicates were programmed to comprehend abstract thought,but also restricted from formulating original thoughts and do not normally possess emotions, the Silicates are capable of understanding that humans experience fear, albeit this comprehension is on an academic level. This made the Silicates a deadly enemy in the AI Wars, because while they experienced no fear in combat, they realized the value of random and savage attacks meant to terrify and demoralize humans.  While the Silicates were incapable of originating such tactics, they simply needed to imitate the long history of terror tactics used by human armies.

A Silicate's inability to experience emotion is contradicted in two episodes: 1×18, 'Pearly', in which a Silicate displays concern for the welfare of and affection for a Silicate that is badly injured and 1×03, 'The Dark Side of the Sun', where revenge upon the protagonists for the death of another Silicate is attempted. The emotional capability of Silicates is never explored by the series, so it is unknown if these displays of emotion were out of character or the intentional development of character types.

It is implied that the AI Wars were not much of a conventional war, with each side gaining and losing territory but largely consisted of Silicates infiltrating human societies and committing random acts of terrorism and sabotage. Fighting was not limited to "front lines" as the Silicates intentionally attacked places humans thought they would be safe, to terrorize them: Shane Vansen's parents were killed when a group of Silicates drove into her middle-class suburban neighborhood, randomly storming her house. The Silicate's gambling-centered ideology even extended to combat tactics: they randomly chose to attack Vansen's home as the result of a coin toss.

The tide of the Human-Chig war began to turn after initial Chig successes because Chig battle-tactics favor large and direct military assaults; the human military switched to guerrilla warfare, which the Chigs were not conceptually experienced with fighting. The subsequent alliance between the Chigs and the remnants of the Silicates, who are quite experienced at non-conventional warfare and terror tactics, partially made up for this deficit in Chig strategy.

In Vitroes

In Vitroes are artificially gestated humans, produced through genetic engineering. Originally, the Silicates were built to be humanity's servants and soldiers but after they revolted the In Vitroes were developed to replace them as the new disposable underclass. Large numbers of In Vitroes were grown as shock troops for use in the AI War.

In Vitroes are created by mix-and-matching chromosomes and genetic sequences from dozens of donors to create optimal traits; they do not have "parents" who ever existed as distinct people. In Vitroes are easily identified by their protruding navel located on the back of the neck, rather than on the abdomen. Some In Vitroes from the same batch contain similar enough genetic material that they could be considered siblings, but they rarely meet. In Vitroes do not generally have "family" members – a fact that affected their morale and loyalty.

In Vitroes do not share social equality with the so-called "naturally born". Literally removed ("born") from their individual gestation tanks at the physical age of eighteen, they are educated swiftly and harshly to enable them to enter society with at least a nominal idea of how to comport themselves. They are derisively termed "tanks" by regular humans, which seems to be a double entendre, describing not only their method of birth but also their physical toughness, which is always greater than "naturals" and their disposable nature, the first to come in battle, the "tanks" that open the way for the infantry.

Due to their limited emotional development, their deployment in the AI War as troops was not as successful as the pioneers of the In Vitro program nor the military would have liked, as the In Vitro battalions had no emotional connection beyond the most basic to their country, planet or even race; this led to their racial reputation as "lazy" and "not caring for anything or anyone" (episode 1.01/1.02), which contributed to the prejudice against them from "naturals". In Vitroes also seem to refer to themselves as "tanks" when with each other. Before its abolition, they were subject to indentured servitude (episode 1.05). There is still considerable racial segregation, resentment by normal humans (e.g. episodes 1.01, 1.06) and governmental abuse for morally dubious purposes (episode 1.13). Two main characters, Cooper Hawkes and T. C. McQueen, have to face all the ramifications of such a society from their perspective as In Vitroes.

This repeating theme explores topics such as racism and prejudice in a society and freedom. It differs from other story arcs in its complexity in the form of a division into two sub-stories. One is presented as historical narration by the characters (e.g. episodes 1.05, 1.18) or flashbacks (episode 1.13); the second occurs in the present, with the experiences of Cooper Hawkes and T. C. McQueen, including a subtle sub-story of the shifting relationship between Nathan West and a maturing Hawkes (e.g. episodes 1.07, 1.11).

Aero-Tech and the UN 
The dark Aero-Tech and UN story arcs inject elements of conspiracy and high-level cover-up. Aero-Tech, founded in 2015 (episode 1.24), appears to be a monopolistic aerospace and defense supplier. It is connected with the UN by Aero-Tech's clearly evident political power with the UN (with a former Aero-Tech director becoming the United Nations Secretary-General in episode 1.06) and with the armed forces, as evidenced by its control over advanced technologies (episodes 1.03, 1.10, 1.16). It is also suspected that Aero-Tech was aware of the Chigs before the rest of humanity, and deliberately endangered the Vesta and Tellus colonists (episodes 1.06, 1.24). Aero-Tech further gathers, uses or withholds strategic information in pursuit of its corporate agenda (e.g. episodes 1.03, 1.09, 1.10, 1.16). The Aero-Tech and the UN story arc explores topics such as power, intrigue, politics, the military-industrial complex, perhaps to some degree also the ethics of science in the service of military and corporate interests and moral responsibility.

Ending
The final episode ends in a cliffhanger, with T. C. McQueen badly injured and most of the major cast apparently killed or missing in action, with only Cooper Hawkes and Nathan West left. Yet with Earth in a much stronger strategic position, there is hope despite the losses and sacrifices. These closing elements of the plot were written at a point when the producers knew that the show was likely to be canceled.

Episodes

Cast and characters

Main: 58th Squadron aka Wildcards 
 Kristen Cloke — Capt. Shane Vansen (USMC), callsign first episodes "Ace of Diamonds", later changed to "Queen of Diamonds". The eldest of three daughters, Vansen was born to two career Marines. Her parents were executed at the hands of a patrol of Silicates during the A.I. War (she would later discover on interrogating a Silicate that her home was invaded, and her parents killed as she and her sisters watched due to a coin toss (the Silicates adhering to their doctrine of "Take a chance"). (Ep1.04) She joined the Marine Corps to honor their memories, and with ambitions to be one of the elite of the 127th Squadron, the "Angry Angels". A natural leader, solid tactician and outstanding pilot, she was quickly chosen by her peers to be in command of her squadron in the early days of the Chig war, (ep1.02) and this choice was reflected in her being selected as 'honcho' by her superiors in missions thereafter. (ep1.04) During the war, she would repeatedly encounter the Silicates, and would demonstrate a cool head under pressure even when facing these nightmares of her childhood. (ep1.04, 1.06, 1.08,1.09) Reflecting her war record (having been wounded several times in combat, receiving repeated citations for achievement in battle as well as the continued respect of her peers and superiors), 1st Lt. Vansen was promoted to Captain in late 2063. (ep 1.17) She was close friends with all of her squadron, subconsciously slipping into the 'big sister' role that she had been denied as she and her sisters had drifted apart in the aftermath of their parents' deaths.
 Morgan Weisser — 1st Lt. Nathan West (USMC), callsign "King of Hearts", Hammerhead dubbed "Above and Beyond" (ep. 1.01). Arguably the heart of the 58th Squadron, Nathan West had never intended to become a Marine. His choice of career and by definition, lifestyle had been in the Tellus Colony program. He and his girlfriend, Kylen Celina had worked long and hard to be selected for the program, with the kind of strong moral conviction of the truly adventurous. They had also been long-standing advocates of In Vitro rights. On the eve of their mission to colonize Tellus, they were advised that one of them was being summarily replaced by an In Vitro, a political decision that had ironically robbed them of their dream. Although Nathan tried to stow away, he was unsuccessful, and was removed from the transport. Kylen stayed on, handing a photo of them together, with a recorded message of "I believe in you" to Nathan. He watched as Kylen and his life flew away. Having been advised that a USMC sentry might be stationed at Tellus, he joined the Marine Corps, and was halfway through training when the news arrived that the Vesta & Tellus colonies had been preemptively attacked by the extraterrestrial species that came to be known as the "Chigs". After undergoing Accelerated Training, he and the rest of the nascent 58th Squadron participated in the "Battle of the Belt"; the Earth forces' first victory against the enemy. 1st Lt. West was credited with six confirmed kills in this space battle. Along with the other members of his Squadron, he was awarded a prestigious medal for this decisive victory. (ep.1.01/1.02)
 Rodney Rowland — 1st Lt. Cooper Hawkes (USMC, In Vitro), callsign "Jack of Spades", Hammerhead dubbed "Pag's Payback". (ep. 1.01) After being scheduled to be "erased" for asking a single question about freedom, Hawkes subdued one of his monitors and killed him in retaliation. Escaping the In Vitro training facility in Philadelphia, Hawkes lived on the streets until being arrested while chasing an In Vitro racist who had tried to hang him. The judge ordered him to the Marines, where he found the only people, he ever cared about: The Wild Cards. He bonded especially with his fellow soldier Mike "Pags" Pagodin, who was K.I.A in the early stages of the conflict with the Chigs; and Lt. Col. "T.C." McQueen, who became a father figure to him.
 Joel de la Fuente — 1st Lt. Paul Wang (USMC), callsign "Joker". After growing up in poverty in his hometown of Chicago, Illinois, Wang enlists and is assigned to the Wildcards. He was especially known for his sense of humor, attachment to the Chicago Cubs and Wrigley Field, and his budding romance with Lt. Stroud (played by Melissa Bowen, who later married Joel de la Fuente) and squadmate Vanessa Damphousse.
 Lanei Chapman — 1st Lt. Vanessa Damphousse (USMC), callsign "Ace of Hearts". Originally from Upstate New York, Damphousse graduated from Caltech with a degree in nuclear physics. She functions as the squad's technical expert. She is in a relationship with a previously married man, who is later revealed to have left her for her best friend. She is close to Paul Wang, with whom she becomes romantically involved over the course of the series.
 James Morrison — Lt. Col. Tyrus Cassius "T. C." McQueen (USMC, In Vitro) callsign "Queen 6". McQueen is the commander who leads the 58th. Prior to assuming this position, McQueen commanded the 127th squadron, the Angry Angels; the unit was decimated during the first contact with the Chigs, leaving McQueen as the sole survivor. He is a veteran of the AI wars, during which he was captured and tortured. McQueen is divorced from his wife due to his inability to procreate naturally. McQueen has a strong bond with Hawkes, for whom he functions as a father figure.

Recurring 
 Tucker Smallwood — Commodore Glen van Ross (USN)
 David Jean Thomas — Gen. Alcott (USMC)
 David St. James — ADM Broden (USN)
 Amanda Douge — Kylen Celina (Aero-Tech, Tellus colonist)
 Tasia Valenza — 1st Lt. Kelly Anne Winslow (USMC) callsign "Queen of Spades"
 Edmund L. Shaff — "Chaplain" (USN)
 Bill Hunter — Secretary General Spencer Chardwell (UN)
 Robert Crow — Officer Crow (Lt. Pruitt in last episode) (USN)
 Doug Hutchison — Elroy EL (AI)
 Kimberly Patton — Feliciti OH (AI)
 John Lendale Bennett — "Master at Arms" (USN)
 Michael Mantell — Howard Sewell (Aero-Tech, member of the board of directors)
 James Lesure — Charlie Stone (USMC)
 Melissa Bowen — LTJG Stroud (USN)
 Gennie Nevinson, Loren Chase — Anne West
 Angus Grant, Marc Worden — Neil West (Private, USMC in ep. 1.07)
 Iva Franks-Singer — Sabrine EW (AI)

Guest stars 
 Coolio — The Host
 David Duchovny (uncredited) — Alvin El 1543 aka "Handsome Alvin" (Silicate)
 Dale Dye, Capt., USMC (ret.) — Major Jack Colquitt (USMC)
 R. Lee Ermey, GySgt., USMC (ret.) (uncredited) — Sergeant Major Frank Bougus (USMC)
 Adam Goldberg — Sergeant 1st Class Louie Fox, Seventh Cavalry, U.S. Army
 Steve Rankin — Lieutenant Colonel Raymond Thomas Butts, callsign "Kick Butts" and "Deuce" (in ep. 1.05, "Raymond Butts")
 Harriet Sansom Harris — Ambassador Diane Hayden (Secretary General, UN) (in ep. 1.06, "Eyes")
 Richard Kind — Colonel Burke (in ep. 1.14, "Level of Necessity")
 Martin Jarvis — Major Cyril MacKendrick (in ep. 1.18, "Pearly")
 Ronald G. Joseph — General Oliver Ranford (USMC) (in ep. 1.20, "Stardust")
 Gail O'Grady (uncredited) — Colonel Klingman (in ep. 1.20, "Stardust")
 Jennifer Balgobin — Communications Lieutenant Price (USN) (in ep. 1.21, "Sugar Dirt")

Production 
While drawing comparisons with Robert Heinlein's novel Starship Troopers and the movie of the same name, according to the producers, the main fictional work that influenced Space: Above and Beyond was one written in response to that story, 1974 science fiction novel The Forever War by Joe Haldeman. In addition, it was inspired by fictional works, such as the 1948 World War II biographic novel The Naked and the Dead by Norman Mailer, the 1895 American Civil War novel The Red Badge of Courage by Stephen Crane, the Iliad, and the 1962 television series Combat! At the same time, Space: Above and Beyond also shares conspiracy elements with other television shows co-produced by the same team, such as The X-Files and Millennium.

Cinematography and visual effects 
The series featured a very dark and desaturated color grading, apparently inherited from the cinematography of series such as The X-Files and Millennium, co-produced by the same team, but taken to a greater extreme. The strength of desaturation employed in many scenes reaches the level that makes them almost black and white (quantitatively, the saturation in CIE xy color subspace of a typical scene in Space: Above and Beyond is in the range 0.03–0.15, approximately 1/4 of a typical contemporary film or television program).

With the increasing affordability of computer systems with performance suitable for 3D rendering, Space: Above and Beyond relied heavily on computer generated imagery (CGI) for space scenes. Physical special effects still played a significant role. The computer generated effects of Space: Above and Beyond, were created by the visual effects company Area 51 using NewTek LightWave 3D. Some of the models used, such as the USS Saratoga and the alien carriers, lack detailed textures and bump maps, which gave them a strongly polygonal appearance.

Music 
Wong and Morgan were looking for a more traditional musical approach than the synthesiser scoring favored on The X-Files; visual effects supervisor Glenn Campbell introduced the producers to the music of Shirley Walker, who had worked on Batman: The Animated Series. Wong and Morgan were initially unconvinced on hearing Walker's synth demos, until it was explained that her musical ideas would be filled out by the orchestra. Wong went on to describe the scoring session as "(his) favorite part of filmmaking." Walker scored the pilot and the entire series, receiving an Emmy nomination for "The River Of Stars," and reunited with Wong and Morgan on many of their later projects (her final film score was for their remake of Black Christmas).

In 2011 La-La Land Records issued a three-disc limited edition featuring Walker's score for the pilot and music from most of the episodes ("The Enemy", "Choice or Chance", "Level of Necessity", "R&R" and "Stardust" do not have any score cues on the album).

Sound Effects 
The sound effects used on the show are often reused on the animated series Futurama.

Criticism 
The actor Joel de la Fuente described his perception of a possibly stereotypical nature of his character Lt. Paul Wang, for which he felt discomfort for the role of "a cowardly soldier who betrayed his comrades":

International broadcasts

Other media 
Space: Above and Beyond was released on DVD in the United States and Canada by 20th Century Fox as a set of five DVD-10 discs on November 8, 2005. Episodes feature closed captioning, and the set also contains some of the original television promotional advertisements for the series. Certain pressings feature a distorted image of the Babylon 5 space station—which is unrelated to and does not appear in the series—on the discs' title screens.

In 2011, Space: Above and Beyond was released on Region 2 PAL DVD in Germany by KSM GmbH.

In April 2012, Space: Above and Beyond was released on Region 2 PAL DVD in the UK by Fremantle Media / Medium Rare Entertainment. It contained a new documentary, cast interviews, some episode commentaries, galleries and deleted scenes. The pilot episode is included in the full season set but has also been released separately with just a commentary.

There were several books and comic books released based on the show's episodes.

References

External links 

 
 
 
 space-readyroom.de – web site about S:AAB with multimedia, images, articles and fan fiction since 1997

1990s American science fiction television series
1995 American television series debuts
1996 American television series endings
Fox Broadcasting Company original programming
Military science fiction television series
Space adventure television series
Television series by 20th Century Fox Television
Television series set in the 2060s
Television shows about the United States Marine Corps